A Bisj, mbis or Bis pole is a ritual artifact created and used by the Asmat people of south-western New Guinea, Indonesia. Bisj poles can be erected as an act of revenge, to pay homage to the ancestors, to calm the spirits of the deceased and to bring harmony and spiritual strength to the community. Bisj poles are a type of wooden ancestor pole among the Asmat of the province of South Papua, Indonesia. Figures of the dead are stacked along the pole, and a phallic symbol of fertility and power is included. The poles were traditionally carved to accompany the feast after a headhunting raid, and although headhunting is no longer practiced, the bisj tradition continues to the present time as a customary practice to honor deceased members of a village.

Objects similar to Bisj poles are found among many peoples of the South Pacific islands, such as peoples from New Zealand and Vanuatu.

Design 
Carved out of a single piece of a wild mangrove tree, Bisj poles can reach heights of up to 25 feet (7.62 m). Their carvings depict human figures standing on top of each other, as well as animal figures, phallic symbols, and carvings in the shape of a canoe prow.

Purpose 
Bisj poles are carved by Asmat religious carvers (wow-ipits) after a member of their tribe or community had been killed and headhunted by an enemy tribe. The Asmat participated in headhunting raids and cannibalism as rituals.

The Asmat believed that if a member of the community had been headhunted, his spirit would linger in the village and cause disharmony.  Bisj poles were erected in order to satisfy these spirits and send them to the afterlife (Safan) across the sea.

Many rituals involved the Bisj poles, including dancing, masquerading, singing and headhunting—all performed by men. Bisj poles often had a receptacle at the base that was meant to hold the heads of enemies taken on headhunting missions.

The phallic symbols represented the strength and virility of the community's ancestors as well as of the warriors going on the headhunting mission.  Canoe prow symbols represented a metaphorical boat that would take the deceased spirits away to the afterlife. The human figures would represent deceased ancestors.

Although headhunting ended in the Asmat region in the 1970s, the poles are still used in rituals today.

Further reading
 Van der Zee, Pauline, Etsjopok: Avenging the Ancestors. The Asmat Bisj Poles and a Proposal for a Morphological Method. Working Papers in Ethnic Art 8 (University of Ghent, Department of Ethnic Art). Ghent, 1996. 
 Van der Zee, Pauline, Bisj-poles: Sculptures from the Rain Forest. Amsterdam: KIT Publishers, 2007. 
 Caglayan, Emily. “The Asmat.” In Heilbrunn Timeline of Art History. New York: The Metropolitan Museum of Art, 2000–"

See also
 Arborglyph
 Dendroglyph
 Dol hareubang
 Headstone
 Huabiao
 Jangseung
 Khachkar
 Lingam
 Megalith
 Memento mori
 Menhir
 Moai
 Mundha
 Picture stone
 Poles in mythology
 Runestone
 Stele
 Totem poles

References

External links
Art and Culture of the Asmat at the Lowell D. Holmes Museum of Anthropology

Phallic symbols
Religious symbols
Indonesian art
Asian sculpture
Papua (province) culture
Headhunting in New Guinea
Wooden sculptures